Talam (also known as Jalam) is a village in Estakhr-e Posht Rural District, Hezarjarib District, Neka County, Mazandaran Province, Iran. At the 2006 census, its population was 33, in 9 families.

References 

Populated places in Neka County